"Til I Forget About You" is the debut single by American pop group, Big Time Rush. It was released via iTunes on September 21, 2010, as the lead single of their debut album.

Background
Before the iTunes release it started popping off with this song on September 14, 2010 on the music site. The single served as the lead single of the group's album, BTR. The physical release of the single was available on September 28, 2010 as a CD single containing the song "Famous" as the B-side in selected stores in the United States. The remix EP was released as a United Kingdom exclusive on August 23, 2011.

Music video
The music video debuted on television on October 1, 2010 on Nickelodeon after the premiere of the Big Time Rush episode, "Big Time Fans". The video begins with the foursome playing inside their tour bus when suddenly Kendall gets a text message from his girlfriend which says "its over". As they arrive to their next venue they find out it's actually a country club and then Carlos finds a button on his Camcorder that says: ROCK OUT, after touching it the camcorder changes the way people and things look and makes them rock, which is when the music sequence starts. The video ends at an indoor concert the group holds inside one of the rooms of the country club.

Track listing
Digital download
"Til I Forget About You" – 3:57

US CD single
"Til I Forget About You" – 3:57
"Famous" – 3:06

UK remix EP
"Til I Forget About You" (radio edit) – 3:22
"Til I Forget About You" (Cash Cash remix - radio edit) – 3:30
"Til I Forget About You" (Halatrax remix - radio edit) – 3:21
"Til I Forget About You" (YBZ mix) – 3:58

Charts

Weekly charts

Year-end charts

Certifications

Release history

References

2010 singles
Big Time Rush songs
2010 songs
Songs written by Sam Hollander
Songs written by Dave Katz
Songs written by Claude Kelly
Song recordings produced by S*A*M and Sluggo